Amanda Lee Williford (born January 22, 1981), known by her stage name Willa Ford, is an American singer, songwriter, dancer, model, television personality and film actress. She released her debut album, Willa Was Here, in 2001. Ford also has appeared in movies such as Friday the 13th (2009), hosted several reality television shows, posed for Playboy and competed on ABC's Dancing with the Stars.

Early life
Ford was raised in Ruskin, Florida. She began singing with the Tampa Bay Children's Choir at age eight. At age 11, she started singing with the Tampa-based children's performing arts troupe, Entertainment Revue. She attended East Bay High School in Gibsonton, Florida.

Career

Music career
In 1999, the 18-year-old Ford started performing under the stage name Mandah and was signed to MCA. Ford was later dropped from MCA and signed by Atlantic Records. Atlantic placed one of Ford's songs, "Lullaby," on the soundtrack for Pokémon: The First Movie. Ford changed her stage name from Mandah to Willa Ford to avoid confusion with Mandy Moore.

In 2000, she was one of the opening acts on the Backstreet Boys' "Into the Millennium" tour.

In 2001, Ford signed on to a new label, Lava Atlantic Records, while on a mall tour for Nautica Kids. Ford wrote most of her own lyrics and served as executive producer for most of her first album. On July 17, 2001, she released Willa Was Here. The album included the single "I Wanna Be Bad" which featured rapper Royce da 5'9". Willa Was Here reached 56 on the Billboard 200 and sold approximately 200,000 copies. Ford went on to release a second single from the album, "Did Ya' Understand That," which failed to garner much attention. Later she explained the reason as the song was released on September 11, 2001 and ruined by the terrorists' attack. "Ooh Ooh" was released as a promotional single, but also failed to find success.

Ford was a spokesperson for Pantene Pro-V's ProVoice campaign while promoting the album. She also appeared in Uncle Kracker's video for "In A Little While." Ford also went on to guest-host MTV's TRL and Say What Karaoke, which led to a hosting contract with Viacom. Ford hosted the MTV reality shows The Morning After and I Bet You Will. In 2001, Ford also co-wrote and recorded a duet with South Korean pop star Park Ji-yoon. The song, titled "Nastified," appeared on Park's fifth album, Man.

In 2003, Ford released a song titled "A Toast to Men." The song, which featured guest rapper Lady May, was featured in daytime promotional ads for soap operas. The single came from her unreleased second album Sexysexobsessive, which was previously titled Porn Poetry. The title track, "Sexysexobsessive," was to be the second single, but it was only released through Ford's official website.

From 2005 to 2006, she appeared as a guest doll in Pussycat Dolls' show at the club in Las Vegas. In 2010, she released the first song since 2003 "All This Time" online, collaborated with Riley Smith. In 2011, Ford resumed her music career with a performance at The Viper Room in LA. In the performance, she revealed her first solo song since 2003, "Back Back Back." In 2014, she was featured in the song "Rock Tonight" by Willa Ford, Eve Nelson and Ray Cervenka.

Television, film, and magazine appearances
In 2002, Ford appeared in an episode of the short-lived television sitcom Raising Dad, playing a bully named Edie. In 2005, Ford hosted the first season of the reality show The Ultimate Fighter on Spike TV. After the show's finale, Ford was contracted as a summer's guest doll performer for the Las Vegas shows of The Pussycat Dolls. Ford was later featured as the June celebrity on FHM'''s 2005 pin-up calendar.

In early 2006, Ford played as one of the four celebrity quarterbacks for the Lingerie Bowl, which was shown during the half-time of Super Bowl XL. Later that year, she was featured in a nude pictorial in the March 2006 issue of Playboy. Stuff magazine ranked her No. 48 in the 101 Sexiest Online Women supplement later that year. In fall 2006, Ford competed on the third season of Dancing with the Stars. Ford and her partner, Maksim Chmerkovskiy, were eliminated in the fifth week of competition. She talked about her experience with Maxim in its January 2007 issue.

Ford appeared on an episode of My Celebrity Home on the Style Network, which aired on January 31, 2007 She also hosted the third season of Pants-Off Dance-Off on Fuse TV. On August 23, 2007, Ford and her then-husband, NHL hockey player Mike Modano, were featured in an episode of MTV Cribs.

Ford appeared in the 2009 slasher film Friday the 13th.

Ford played Becca in the direct-to-video Universal Squadrons, which was first shown at the Comic-Con International Independent Film Festival in 2010.

Ford appeared in a 2011 episode of The Glades. In 2012, she appeared in 4 episodes of the Magic City and an episode of Leverage season five. In June 2014, it was announced that she was working on four films: Submerged, Any Day, The Nurse, and Checkmate.

Ford was also cast in the film Assassin's Fury, but was later dropped. In an interview with BZFilm.com, producer Fabio Soldani said that Ford was replaced after five days of shooting and that she was "a nightmare to be around" and "shooting was a really sad place to be for those 5 days".

In 2019, Ford appeared on an E!'s reality show Flip It Like Disick.

Personal life
Ford and hockey player Mike Modano married in a small, private ceremony on August 25, 2007, in Athens, Texas. In August 2012, Ford and Modano announced that they were divorcing.

In April 2015, Ford married former NFL linebacker Ryan Nece. In March 2016, it was announced that the couple was expecting their first child. On September 7, 2016, Ford gave birth to a son.

Discography

Albums

Singles

Filmography

Film

Television

Music videos

Other
Television live performances
 Teensasion Hard Rock Live Total Request Live The Tonight Show with Jay Leno Live with Regis and Kelly Nickelodeon''

Television commercials
 Six Flags Magic Mountain

Events
 Pantene Pro-Voice Live
 Guavaween

References

External links

1981 births
Living people
21st-century American women singers
American dance musicians
American women pop singers
American film actresses
American women record producers
Record producers from Florida
Entertainers from Florida
Actresses from Tampa, Florida
Musicians from Tampa, Florida
People from Ruskin, Florida
Atlantic Records artists
Participants in American reality television series
21st-century American singers